Nathan Dahlberg (born 22 February 1964) is a former New Zealand racing cyclist. He rode in the Tour de France in 1988 and 1989 and was 39th in the 1990 Giro d'Italia. Dahlberg spent his career being a domestique for other riders and occasionally being allowed to race for himself.

After retiring from racing Dahlberg managed the  until it folded in 2012. In 2015 he set sights on the world record for highest elevation cycled. He chose Broad Peak as the place for this attempt as it provided flat enough terrain to ride the required 20m for the record. While he was hiking up the 12th highest mountain in the world he slipped on some ice and fell down the hill. Luckily he didn't fall too far and was able to use his ice pick to stop himself. He survived with just a head cut but lost his passport and other valuables. His team abandoned the expedition at the second camp as conditions were unsuitable for the attempt.

Career

7/11 cycling team
Dahlberg's professional cycling career started with the  team in 1988. His first race for the team was Tour of the Basque Country where he came 73rd overall. He then rode Amstel Gold Race and  Bordeaux–Paris followed by the GP Betekom where he placed sixth. 

Dalhberg's first Tour de France participation was at the expense of his teammate , Bob Roll, who crashed into a spectator the day before the Tour started. Dahlberg had just come home from a training ride, and was met by a staff member from the team saying he needed to get to France tomorrow. They ended up driving all night and arrived at 5:30am with the first stage starting at 9am.

Amateur again
In 2001 Dahlberg did not race for a professional team but he still managed to get some great results. In April he won the Tour du Maroc, a 13-stage race in Morocco. He won Stage 5 of the race by 54 seconds taking the leaders jersey then not losing time to his rivals in the remaining stages.

Marco Polo

In 2005 while riding for  Dahlberg and fellow kiwi cyclist Robin Reid had a competition to see who could reach 10,000km the fastest. Dahlberg lost as he spent a lot of 2005 being the team director.

Major results
Sources:
1985
 2nd Grand Prix de la ville de Pérenchies
1988
 6th GP Betekom 
1990
 1st Stage 1 Tour de Suisse
 7th Giro della Toscana
1991
 1st Stage 9 Ruta Mexico
 3rd Reading Classic
 6th Trofeo dell'Etna
1992
 3rd Overall Casper Classic
1st Stage 8
2000
 10th Overall Tour of South China Sea
2001
 1st Overall Tour du Maroc
1st Stage 5
 4th Overall Tour du Faso
 10th Overall Perlis Open
2002
 1st Stage 2 Tour de Serbia
2004
 1st Overall Tour d'Indonesia
2010
 7th Overall Tour d'Indonesia

References

External links
 

1964 births
Living people
New Zealand male cyclists
Sportspeople from Whanganui
Tour de Suisse stage winners